The boha (also known as the Cornemuse Landaise or bohaossac) is a type of bagpipe native to the Landes of Gascony in southwestern France.

This bagpipe is notable in that it bears a greater resemblance to Eastern European bagpipes, particularly the contra-chanter bagpipes of the Pannonian Plain (e.g., the Hungarian duda), than to other Western European pipes. It features both a chanter and a drone bored into a common rectangular body. Both chanter and drone use single reeds.

External links 
Association of Bohaires of Gascony

Bibliography 
Sur le site des Bohaires de Gasconha
Sur le site de Big Boha Band
Sur le site de Rock'n'Trad

Bagpipes
French musical instruments
Landes (department)